Playland Park was an amusement park formerly located at 2222 North Alamo in San Antonio, Texas. Playland Park opened in 1943 and was owned by Jimmy Johnson. Prior to this it operated as a small venue at Brackenridge Park ca. 1942. It was the original home of The Rocket, a popular wooden roller coaster. Ed Gaida, who lived at Playland Park and had access to records and archives, wrote a book about the park and Johnson.

Playland Park of San Antonio, Texas should not be confused with Playland Park of Houston, Texas which operated around the same time and had a wooden roller coaster similarly named "The Skyrocket." These two parks operated independently of each other.

Playland Park closed on Labor Day September 1, 1980. For several decades, the original "Playland" sign stood at the original gate, the last remnant of the park. Today, the location is a campus of the Alamo Colleges District and no trace remains of the original park. Since its closure, a new theme park, Six Flags Fiesta Texas (Originally simply called Fiesta Texas) has been San Antonio's main amusement destination.

The Rocket
The Rocket was designed and built by Herb Schmeck and the Philadelphia Toboggan Company. The roller coaster operated from 1947 until the park's closure in 1980. Knoebels Amusement Resort in Elysburg, Pennsylvania purchased the ride in 1984 and dismantled it in early 1985. As there were no blueprints to work with, each individual board was numbered and cataloged on site.  The restored roller coaster opened at Knoebels on June 15, 1985, as The Phoenix.

See also
List of abandoned amusement parks
Playland Park (Houston, Texas)
Six Flags Fiesta Texas
SeaWorld San Antonio

References

External links
History of Playland Park
The Playland Rocket

Buildings and structures in San Antonio
Defunct amusement parks in Texas
Amusement parks in Texas
1943 establishments in Texas
1980 disestablishments in Texas
Amusement parks closed in 1980